Desulfuromonas is a Gram negative bacterial genus from the family of Desulfuromonadaceae. Desulfuromonas can reduce elemental sulfur to H2S. Desulfuromonas occur in anoxic sediments and saline lakes.

References

Further reading

External links
 MicrobeWiki

Desulfuromonadales
Bacteria genera